The 2022 Cork Senior A Hurling Championship was the third staging of the Cork Senior A Hurling Championship since its establishment by the Cork County Board in 2020. The draw for the group stage placings took place on 8 February 2022. The championship ran from 30 July to 9 October 2022.

The final was played on 9 October 2022 at Páirc Uí Chaoimh in Cork, between Courcey Rovers and Fr. O'Neill's, in what was their first ever meeting in the final. Fr. O'Neill's won the match by 0-20 to 2-12 to claim their first ever championship title in the grade.

Declan Dalton was the championship's top scorer with 1-50.

Team changes

To Championship

Relegated from the Cork Premier Senior Hurling Championship
 Carrigtwohill

Promoted from the Cork Premier Intermediate Hurling Championship
 Courcey Rovers

From Championship

Promoted to the Cork Premier Senior Hurling Championship
 Kanturk

Relegated to the Cork Premier Intermediate Hurling Championship
 Bandon

Participating clubs

Group A

Group A table

Group A results

Group B

Group B table

Group B results

Group C

Group C table

Group C results

Knockout stage

Bracket

Relegation playoff

Quarter-finals

Semi-finals

Final

Championship statistics

Top scorers

Overall

In a single game

Miscellaneous

 Fr. O'Neill's win their first Senior A title, having lost previous two finals.

References

External link

 Cork GAA website

Cork Senior A Hurling Championship
Cork
Cork Senior A Hurling Championship